Midnight Oil is an album by saxophonist Jerome Richardson recorded in 1958 and released on the New Jazz label in 1959.

Reception

Scott Yanow of AllMusic states, "This set offers cool-toned bop that, although brief in playing time (just over 35 minutes), is enjoyable".

Track listing 
All compositions by Jerome Richardson except where noted
 "Minorally" – 6:55
 "Way In Blues" – 5:08
 " Trimmings" – 5:17
 "Caravan" (Juan Tizol, Duke Ellington, Irving Mills) – 10:45
 "Lyric" (Artie Shaw) – 7:18

Personnel 
Jerome Richardson – tenor saxophone, flute
Jimmy Cleveland – trombone (track 1-4)
Kenny Burrell – guitar
Hank Jones – piano
Joe Benjamin – bass
Charlie Persip – drums

References 

Jerome Richardson albums
1959 albums
Albums recorded at Van Gelder Studio
New Jazz Records albums
Albums produced by Esmond Edwards